Cobe is a Copenhagen-based architectural firm owned and managed by architect Dan Stubbergaard. As of 2020, the office has 150 employees and is involved in a large number of projects throughout Europe and North America within urban planning, architecture, landscape architecture and interior design.

History
Cobe was founded by Dan Stubbergaard in 2006 in Copenhagen, where he and his studio since then has been involved with more than 200 projects in the city within urban planning, architecture and landscape architecture. 
Among the firm's projects are Nørreport Station, The Silo, Israels Plads, Krøyers Plads, Køge Nord Station and the development of Papirøen (Paper Island) in Copenhagen.

The Studio

Since 2018, Cobe's studio has been located in the new city district of Nordhavn in Copenhagen, which the drawing office also won the master plan competition for in 2008.

Selected completed projects
 2019: Frederiksberg Allé 41, Copenhagen, DK
 2019: Alfred Nobels Bro, Copenhagen, DK
 2019: Designmuseum Denmark, Copenhagen, DK
 2019: Roskilde Festival Folk High School, Roskilde, DK
 2019: Ultra-Fast Charging Stations for Electric Cars, Fredericia, DK
 2019: Køge Nord Station, Køge, DK
 2019: Karen Blixens Plads, Copenhagen, DK
 2018: Adidas HalfTime, Herzogenaurauch, DE
 2018: Tingbjerg Culture House and Library, Copenhagen, DK 
 2017: The Silo, Copenhagen, DK
 2017: Red Cross Volunteer House, Copenhagen, DK
 2017: Kids’ City, Copenhagen, DK
 2017: Landgangen, Esbjerg, DK
 2016: Ragnarock - Museum for Pop, Rock and Youth Culture, Roskilde, DK 
 2015: Krøyers Plads, Copenhagen, DK
 2015: Nørreport Station, Copenhagen, DK
 2015: Frederiksvej Kindergarten, Frederiksberg, Copenhagen, DK
 2014: Israels Plads, Copenhagen, DK,
 2014: Forfatterhuset Kindergarten, Copenhagen, DK
 2013: Porsgrunn Maritime Museum, Porsgrunn, NO
 2012: The Danish Pavilion for Expo 2012, Yeosu, South Korea
 2012: Vester Voldgade, Copenhagen, DK
 2011: The Library, Copenhagen, DK
 2009: Taastrup Theatre, Taastrup, DK

Selected projects under construction (completion year)

 Europahafenkopf, Bremen, DE, (2021)
 Paper Island, København, DK, (2023)
 The Tip of Redmolen, Nordhavn, DK, (2022)
 Place Schuman, Bruxelles, BE (2022)
 West Don Lands, Toronto, CA (2022)
 Kronløb Island, Copenhagen, DK (2023)
 The Opera Park, Copenhagen, DK (2023)
 ESS - European Spallation Source, Lund, SE, (2013-2025)
 Bremerhaven Harbour Masterplan, Bremerhaven. Germany

Selected exhibitions (exhibition year)

 2020: Our Urban Living Room, Aedes, Berlin, DE
 2018: Our Urban Living Room, Laituri, Helsinki, FI
 2016: Our Urban Living Room, DAC – the Danish Architecture Center, Copenhagen, DK

Selected publications (publication year)

 2018: The Silo, Strandberg Publishing
 2016: Our Urban Living Room, Arvinius+Orfeus Publishing

Selected awards
 
 2020: MIPIM Award Finalist – Best Industrial & Logistics Development
 2020: Archdaily Building of the Year Award
 2020 German Design Award
2020: Dezeen Landscape Award
 2019: Dezeen Awards Finalist
 2019: Architizer A+ Awards Jury Winner
 2019: Fast Company's Innovation by Design Award Honoree
 2019: Danish Design Award Finalist
 2019: IABSE Denmark's Structure Award
 2019: Red Dot Communication & Brands Award
 2018: Civic Trust Award
 2018: MIPIM Award Finalist – Best Refurbished Building
 2018: CTBUH Awards – Best Tall Building Europe
 2018: AZ Awards – Best Residential Architecture
 2018: Global Galvanizers Award
 2018: RENOVER Prisen
 2018: Architizer Project of the Year Award A+ Award
 2018: German Design Award
 2018: Building Awards – The Infrastructure Award
 2017: German Design Award
 2017: Danish Landscape Award
 2017: ArchDaily Building of the Year Award
 2017: Wallpaper*Design Award
 2017: Architizer A+ Awards
 2017: Green Good Design Award
 2018, 2017, 2016, 2014, 2011: Copenhagen Award for Architecture
 2017: Landezine International Landscape Award
 2016: Danish Lighting Award
 2016: WAN Transport Award
 2016: Eckersberg Royal Medal
 2016: European Prize for Urban Public Space
 2016, 2015, 2014, 2013, 2012: Børsen Gazelle Award
 2015: Iconic Award – Visionary Architecture
 2015: MIPIM Award Finalist – Best Futura Project
 2015: Dreyer's Foundation Grand Prize of Honor
 2013: Byggeskikprisen
 2012: MIPIM Award – Best Refurbished Building
 2012: Nykredit's Architecture Prize
 2007: Nykredit's Motivation Award
 2006: The Golden Lion at the Venice Biennale of Architecture

References

External links
 Official website 
 Downtown Høje-Tåstrup masterplan
 COBE i Arkitekturbilleder.dk
 COBE Transform i Arkitekturbilleder.dk

Architecture firms of Denmark
Architecture firms based in Copenhagen
Companies based in Copenhagen Municipality
Design companies established in 2006
Danish companies established in 2006